This article lists the heads of the Serbian Orthodox Church, since the establishment of the church as an autocephalous archbishopric in 1219 to today's patriarchate. The list includes all the archbishops and patriarchs that led the Serbian Orthodox Church under the Serbian Archbishopric and Serbian Patriarchate of Peć. Today, the church is unified under a patriarch who is officially styled as Archbishop of Peć, Metropolitan of Belgrade and Karlovci, and Serbian Patriarch.

According to the current constitution of the Serbian Orthodox Church, the patriarch is elected by a special convocation of the Bishops' Council, and serves as the chairman of the Holy Synod.

The current patriarch is Porfirije, elected on 18 February 2021. He acceded to this position the next day, following his enthronement in the St. Michael's Cathedral in Belgrade. Porfirije was formally enthroned to the ancient throne of the Serbian patriarchs in the Patriarchal Monastery of Peć on 14 October 2022.

The autocephalous Serbian Archbishopric was founded in 1219 by Sava, under the authority of the ecumenical patriarch of Constantinople. In 1346, when Stefan Dušan proclaimed himself emperor, he also elevated the archiepiscopal see of Peć to the rank of a patriarchate, creating the Serbian Patriarchate of Peć. This was only recognized by the Ecumenical Patriarchate of Constantinople in 1375.

After the Ottoman conquest of the Serbian Despotate in 1459, the patriarchate gradually lost its importance. At times the church was forced by the Ottoman government to install Greeks in the office. From 1766 to 1920 the patriarchate was abolished and all ecclesiastical jurisdiction was given to the patriarch of Constantinople. A metropolitan see was maintained in Belgrade from 1766 afterwards. There were also independent Serbian Orthodox sees based in Karlovci and in Montenegro.

In 1920, the church was reunified and the patriarchy was reestablished with the see moving to Belgrade, but retaining the lineage of the throne of Saint Sava in Peć. The patriarch holds ecclesiastical authority over the Orthodox Church in the territory of the former Yugoslavia, and also over the Serbian Orthodox diaspora in Western Europe, Australia, and the Americas.

Styles
Currently, the style of the head of the Serbian Orthodox Church is "Archbishop of Peć, Metropolitan of Belgrade and Karlovci, and Serbian Patriarch" (архиепископ пећки, митрополит београдско-карловачки и патријарх српски). The short title is "Serbian Patriarch" (патријарх српски). Historically, various styles have been used.

Archbishop Sava (s. 1219–33) was styled "Archbishop of Serb Lands" and "Archbishop of Serb Lands and the Littoral" in the Vranjina charter, while Domentijan ( 1253) used the style "Archbishop of all the Serbian and coastal lands" when speaking of Sava. The fresco of Sava at Mileševa calls him "the first Archbishop of All Serb and Diocletian Lands". Archbishop Sava III (s. 1309–16) was styled "Archbishop of All Serb and Littoral Lands".

Legend

Archbishops, 1219–1346

Patriarchs, 1346–1766

Patriarchs, 1920–present

Timeline

See also
 Serbian Orthodox Church
 Patriarchate of Peć (monastery)
 Archbishopric of Belgrade and Karlovci
 Metropolitanate of Belgrade
 Metropolitanate of Karlovci
 Patriarchate of Karlovci
 Metropolitanate of Montenegro and the Littoral
 List of metropolitans of Montenegro
 Greek Catholic Church of Croatia and Serbia
 Greek Catholic Eparchy of Križevci
 Greek Catholic Eparchy of Ruski Krstur
 Religion in Serbia
 Religion in Vojvodina

Annotations
 The Ottomans did not recognize the official title of "Archbishop of Peć and Serbian Patriarch".  However, church records still record these three men as Patriarchs even though they did not serve in full title. They were still known as the guardians or protectors of the "throne of Saint Sava".
 The patriarchs hold the title of Archbishop of Peć, Metropolitan of Belgrade and Karlovci, and Serbian Patriarch and are considered the successors to the Patriarchal throne of Peć. However, the Patriarchy is based in Belgrade, Serbia.

References

Sources

External links
Serbian Orthodox Church, history at spc.rs
Pages on most of the Serbian Patriarchs (in Serbian)
Kosovo.com: another list of Serbian Patriarchs
Hierarchical Succession of the Patriarchal See of Serbia from the Orthodox Research Institute

list
Primates of the Serbian Orthodox Church
Serbian
Serbia
Serbia
Orthodox Church heads